The West Moreton colonial by-election, 1860 was a by-election held on 9 July 1860 in the electoral district of West Moreton for the Queensland Legislative Assembly.

History
On 22 June 1860, William Nelson, member for West Moreton, was unseated by petition. Joseph Fleming won the resulting by-election on 9 July 1860.

See also
 Members of the Queensland Legislative Assembly, 1860–1863

References

1860 elections in Australia
Queensland state by-elections
1860s in Queensland